The Copa do Brasil 2005 was the 17th staging of the Copa do Brasil. 

The competition started on February 2, 2005 and concluded on June 22, 2005 with the second leg of the final, held at the Estádio São Januário in Rio de Janeiro, in which Paulista lifted the trophy for the first time after a 0-0 draw with Fluminense.

Fred, of Cruzeiro, with 15 goals, was the competition's topscorer.

Format
The competition was contested by 64 clubs in a knock-out format where all rounds were played over two legs and the away goals rule was used, but in the first two rounds if the away team won the first leg with an advantage of at least two goals, the second leg was not played and the club automatically qualified to the next round.

Competition stages

Notes

References
 Copa do Brasil 2005 at RSSSF
 Copa do Brasil 2005 table at Bola na Área

2005 domestic association football cups
2005 in Brazilian football
2005